The qualification for the 2012 Men's Olympic Handball Tournament is held from January 2011 to April 2012.

Qualification summary

World Championship

Continental qualification

Europe (1st ranking continent)

America (2nd ranking continent)

Asia (3rd ranking continent)

Preliminary round
http://todor66.com/handball/Asia/Men_OQ_2011.html

Group A

23.10	16:20	Saudi Arabia	41-26	Uzbekistan	17-13

23.10	20:20	Iran	27-23	Kuwait	11-9

24.10	13:00	Saudi Arabia	22-21	Iran	11-8

24.10	17:00	Qatar	38-32	Uzbekistan	20-15

25.10	15:00	Qatar	31-31	Kuwait	16-15

27.10	13:00	Iran	45-22	Uzbekistan	22-8

27.10	17:00	Saudi Arabia	30-21	Kuwait	16-10

28.10	15:00	Iran	35-32	Qatar	14-15

29.10	13:00	Kuwait	44-26	Uzbekistan	18-12

29.10	17:00	Qatar	28-27	Saudi Arabia	14-11

Group B

23.10	14:20	South Korea	31-18	Japan	14-6

23.10	18:20	Oman	41-27	Kazakhstan	21-15

24.10	15:00	Japan	26-24	China	12-10

24.10	19:00	South Korea	41-15	Kazakhstan	24-5

25.10	17:00	South Korea	31-24	Oman	13-14

27.10	15:00	Japan	34-29	Oman	20-8

27.10	19:00	China	38-16	Kazakhstan	19-8

28.10	17:00	South Korea	31-25	China	13-10

29.10	15:00	Japan	46-15	Kazakhstan	22-5

29.10	19:00	China	24-23	Oman	12-13

Knockout round

Final standing

Africa (4th ranking continent)

2012 IHF Qualification Tournaments 

The teams eligible to participate in these three IHF Qualification Tournaments are seeded as follows :

Notes:
 Continents are ranked based on the 2011 World Championship results.
 If the Oceania representative at the 2011 World Championship had placed from 8th to 12th, Oceania would have earned a spot for IHF Qualification Tournament #3.  Oceania's representative (Australia) placed 24th.

2012 IHF Qualification Tournament #1

2012 IHF Qualification Tournament #2

2012 IHF Qualification Tournament #3

References

External links
ihf.info
2012 Olympic Handball Qualification- Men (Format and Results)
Qualification System

Handball Men
Olympic Qualification Men
Olympic Qualification Men
Q
Olympics